is a Japanese manga series written and illustrated by Yūgo Ishikawa. It was serialized in Shogakukan's seinen manga magazine Weekly Big Comic Spirits from 1996 to 2001, with its chapters collected in fifteen tankōbon volumes. A twenty-episode anime television series animated by Pierrot was broadcast in Japan on TBS from November 1998 to March 1999.

Plot
Despite her appearance, Fūka is just an ordinary elementary school girl. When she moves in with her relatives and enrolls in the local school, her body draws the attention of teachers and students. Totally unaware of this, with a mentality of her own age, Fūka tries to get by her school life with just like her classmates. However, due to the contrast between her appearance and mind, her actions end up causing misunderstandings and troubles among people around her.

Characters

Media

Manga
Written and illustrated by Yūgo Ishikawa, Yoiko was serialized in Shogakukan's seinen manga magazine Weekly Big Comic Spirits from 1996 to 2001. At first, it was planned to be a short series, and Shogakukan collected its chapters in two volumes, released under the Big Spirits Comics Special imprint in May 1997 and January 1998; however, after the series began a regular weekly serialization in the magazine, lasting longer than planned, this edition was discontinued. Shogakukan released fifteen tankōbon volumes, from June 30, 1998, to May 30, 2001.

Anime
A twenty-episode anime television series adaptation, animated by Pierrot, was broadcast in Japan on TBS from November 7, 1998, to March 27, 1999.

Reception
John Oppliger of AnimeNation called the series a "Golden Boy style ribald comedy". Oppliger also considered it one of the earliest true fan service anime television series, but he commented that unlike contemporary fan service anime, Yoikos nudity and sex gags were "innocent and humorous, circumstantial rather than provocative like today's "fan service.""

Reference

External links
 

Anime series based on manga
Comedy anime and manga
School life in anime and manga
Seinen manga
Shogakukan franchises
Shogakukan manga
Pierrot (company)
TBS Television (Japan) original programming